The 1935–36 British Ice Hockey season was a confusing season because a new English National league had been formed partway through the season and teams had defected into it.

Last English League
This was the last version of the English League which resulted in Birmingham Maple Leafs defeating Streatham Royals 4–2 in the final play off.

Southern Group
Folded in December; Streatham Royals named champion.

Northern Group

Inaugural English National League

Scottish League
Glasgow Mohawks won the championship and received the Canada Cup.

Scores

(*Match was awarded to Kelvingrove as Glasgow University scratched.)

Table

Mitchell Trophy

Results

President's Pucks

Results

References 

British